The 2022 Namibia Tri-Nation Series was the 18th round of the 2019–2023 ICC Cricket World Cup League 2 cricket tournament which took place in Namibia in December 2022. It was a tri-nation series between Namibia, Nepal and the Scotland cricket teams, with the matches played as One Day International (ODI) fixtures. The ICC Cricket World Cup League 2 formed part of the qualification pathway to the 2023 Cricket World Cup.

Originally the series was scheduled to take place in April 2020. However, on 24 March 2020, the International Cricket Council (ICC) confirmed that all ICC qualifying events scheduled to take place before 30 June 2020 had been postponed due to the COVID-19 pandemic. In December 2020, the ICC announced the rescheduled dates for the series.

Squads

Jan Frylinck was ruled out of Namibia's squad due to an ankle injury.

Fixtures

1st ODI

2nd ODI

3rd ODI

4th ODI

5th ODI

6th ODI

References

External links
 Series home at ESPNcricinfo

2022 in Namibian cricket
2022 in Nepalese cricket
2022 in Scottish cricket
International cricket competitions in 2022–23
Namibia
Namibia
Namibia Tri-Nation Series